Antha Arabic Kadaloram is a 1995 Indian Tamil language song composed by A. R. Rahman for the romantic drama film Bombay (1995) by Mani Ratnam. It was remade by Tanishk Bagchi & Badshah  as "The Humma Song" (also known as "Ek Ho Gaye Hum Aur Tum")  as a tribute to Rahman in 2017 in the Hindi language for the romantic drama film, OK Jaanu.
 "The Humma song" amassed over 273 million views on YouTube.

Reception

Original track
The song is used in the Tamil film Bombay directed by Mani Ratnam in 1995. Composer A R Rahman experimented with adding rap style music into Indian cinema with the Humma Humma.

Remake track
Tanishk Bagchi and Baadshah composed the remake version and Baadshah added his rap to the song. The song is used in the Shraddha Kapoor and Aditya Roy Kapoor starrer film OK Jaanu (2017).

References

Tamil-language songs
Tamil film songs
Hindi songs
Hindi film songs
Indian songs
Macaronic songs
2017 songs
Shashaa Tirupati songs
Jubin Nautiyal songs
Songs with music by A. R. Rahman
Songs with lyrics by Mehboob